Killowen Castle was a castle situated at Killowen, County Down, Northern Ireland. The castle was built by Justiciar of Ireland, John FitzGeoffrey in 1248.

References
 Bardon, Jonathan, A History of Ulster, page 45. The Black Staff Press, 2005. 

Castles in County Down